Michael L. Connolly (born June 3, 1980) is an American activist, attorney, and politician from Massachusetts.

Early life and career
Connolly was born in the Dorchester area of Boston, Massachusetts. From 2004 to 2006 he was a project manager for Rexel. In 2007 he was a legal intern for the Berkman Klein Center for Internet & Society at Harvard University. From 2009 to 2010 he was a communications fellow for the Boston College Law Magazine. While in law school, he volunteered with the Appellate Division of the Committee for Public Council Services where he served as an editor for the Intellectual Property and Technology Forum. During this time he also spent summers working for the law firm of Goulston & Storrs, P.C. and the Berkman Center for Internet and Society. He is a former staff writer and managing editor for the Journal of Law and Social Justice (formerly known as The Third World Law Journal). From 2011 to 2012 he was a project manager for HP Autonomy. From 2013 to 2014 he was the founder and campaign manager of Net Zero Cambridge. Since 2013 he has been an instructor and tutor for Kaplan, Inc.

Political career
From 2014 to 2015 he was an aide to Cambridge city councilman Dennis Carlone.

He defeated Representative Timothy J. Toomey Jr. in September 2016 in the Democratic primary for the 26th Middlesex District, which comprises East Cambridge and East Somerville. Connolly was active with Occupy Boston and ran unsuccessfully against Toomey in 2012. In 2016, he was backed by Our Revolution, a Bernie Sanders-based political organization, and was endorsed by the prominent Cambridge academics Noam Chomsky and Lawrence Lessig. Connolly beat Toomey by about 300 votes and was elected to represent the 26th Middlesex District after Toomey's term ended; Connolly did not face a Republican in the November 2016 election for the Massachusetts House of Representatives. Connolly opposed the November 2016 "ballot question that would lift the charter school cap" and supports the legalization of recreational marijuana. He is a member of the Democratic Socialists of America.

Personal life and family
Connolly is 6 feet 8 inches tall and played college football at Duke University. He is also a graduate of Boston College Law School.

See also
List of Democratic Socialists of America who have held office in the United States
 2019–2020 Massachusetts legislature
 2021–2022 Massachusetts legislature

References

External links
 Legislative website
 Constituent website
 Campaign website
 Mike Connolly (2012 campaign)

1980 births
21st-century American lawyers
21st-century American politicians
Massachusetts lawyers
People from Cambridge, Massachusetts
Massachusetts Democrats
Massachusetts Independents
Massachusetts socialists
Duke University alumni
Boston College Law School alumni
Duke Blue Devils football players
Living people
Members of the Massachusetts House of Representatives
Democratic Socialists of America politicians from Massachusetts